Daniel Lee Lasco II (born October 9, 1992) is a former American football running back. He played college football at California.

Early years
Lasco attended The Woodlands High School in The Woodlands, Texas. He started as the Highlander's running back for three seasons and lettered for all four, becoming the first freshman to score a varsity touchdown in his school's history. During his career he rushed for 3,821 yards and 43 touchdowns, breaking his high school records for most career rushing yards and touchdowns. He committed to the University of California, Berkeley to play college football over offers from Arkansas, Iowa, Miami (FL), Notre Dame, Texas A&M, and TCU.

College career
After redshirting his first year at California in 2011, Lasco played in all 12 games as a redshirt freshman in 2012 and had 109 rushing yards on 8 carries with a touchdown. As a sophomore in 2013, he played in eight games and had 67 carries for 317 with two touchdowns. As a junior in 2014, he started 11 of 12 games and rushed for 1,115 yards on 210 carries with 12 touchdowns. In nine games during his senior year in 2015, Lasco rushed for 331 yards on 65 carries and three touchdowns.

Professional career
At the 2016 NFL Combine, Lasco had an 11-foot, three inch broad jump which set the combine record for a running back since 2006.

In the 2016 NFL Draft, Lasco was selected by the New Orleans Saints. On May 9, 2016, the Saints signed Lasco to a four-year deal.

On September 8, 2017, Lasco was waived by the Saints and was re-signed to the practice squad. He was promoted to the active roster on October 17, 2017. In Week 10, Lasco was taken off the field in an ambulance with a spine injury after making a headfirst tackle on a kickoff return. He was diagnosed with a bulging disc in his spine and was placed on injured reserve on November 14, 2017.

On July 18, 2018, Lasco was waived by the Saints with a failed physical and was placed on the reserve/PUP List.

On March 6, 2019, Lasco was released by the Saints.

References

External links
California Golden Bears bio

1992 births
Living people
American football running backs
California Golden Bears football players
New Orleans Saints players
People from The Woodlands, Texas
Players of American football from Texas
Sportspeople from Harris County, Texas